Lake Maurer is a lake in Clay County in the U.S. state of Missouri.

Lake Maurer is named after J. F. and J. H. Maurer, proprietors of a resort on the shore of the lake.

See also
List of lakes in Missouri

References

Bodies of water of Clay County, Missouri
Lakes of Missouri